Alexander Butler Rowley (3 October 1837 – 9 January 1911) was an English first-class cricketer active from 1854 to 1871 who played for Lancashire. He was born in Manchester and died in Dover. He appeared in 31 first-class matches as a right-handed batsman who bowled left arm slow medium roundarm. He scored 967 runs with a highest score of 63 not out and took 78 wickets with a best performance of six for 21.

Notes

1837 births
1911 deaths
English cricketers
Lancashire cricketers
Manchester Cricket Club cricketers
North v South cricketers
Gentlemen cricketers
Surrey Club cricketers
Gentlemen of the North cricketers
Gentlemen of the South cricketers